Iván Ramírez (born 8 December 1994) is a Paraguayan footballer who plays as a right-back for Central Córdoba SdE.

References

External links

1994 births
Living people
Association football midfielders
Paraguayan footballers
Paraguayan expatriate footballers
Paraguay under-20 international footballers
Footballers at the 2015 Pan American Games
Pan American Games competitors for Paraguay
Club Libertad footballers
Deportivo Santaní players
Club Rubio Ñu footballers
Godoy Cruz Antonio Tomba footballers
Club Guaraní players
Central Córdoba de Santiago del Estero footballers
Argentine Primera División players
Paraguayan Primera División players
Paraguayan expatriate sportspeople in Argentina
Expatriate footballers in Argentina